"It's a Business Doing Pleasure with You" is a song written by Nickelback frontman Chad Kroeger and country musician Brett James, and recorded by American country music artist Tim McGraw. The song is the first single to his tenth studio album, Southern Voice. It is also McGraw's fifty-second chart entry on the Billboard country charts. The song was released to radio on June 29, 2009.

Content
The song's narrator is frustrated with buying items for his lover, telling her that "it's a business doing pleasure with [her]". The song's title is an inversion of the phrase "It's a pleasure doing business with you."

Chart performance
"It's a Business Doing Pleasure with You" debuted at number 35 on the U.S. Billboard Hot Country Songs chart in July 2009, and reached a peak of number 13 on the chart in September 2009.

References

2009 singles
2009 songs
Tim McGraw songs
Songs written by Brett James
Songs written by Chad Kroeger
Song recordings produced by Byron Gallimore
Song recordings produced by Tim McGraw
Curb Records singles